Acarlar is a village in the Amasra District, Bartın Province, Turkey. Its population is 138 (2021).

The village is 38 km from Bartın city center and 23 km from Amasra district center.

References

Villages in Amasra District